"Parietal foramen" may refer to:
 Pineal foramen, a midline hole in the skull roof which hosts the parietal eye in many vertebrate species
 Parietal foramina, paired openings in the parietal bones of humans, which host the emissary veins